Boris Sanson (born 7 December 1980 in Bordeaux, France) is a French sabre fencer.

Sanson won the gold medal in the sabre team event at the 2006 World Fencing Championships in Turin after beating Spain in the final. He accomplished this with his teammates Vincent Anstett, Julien Pillet and Nicolas Lopez.  He competed at the 2008 Beijing Olympics for France, winning a team gold medal and finishing 14th in the individual event.

Achievements
 2005 World Fencing Championships, team sabre
 2006 World Fencing Championships, team sabre
 2007 World Fencing Championships, team sabre
 2008 Beijing Olympics, team sabre

References

1980 births
Living people
French male sabre fencers
Fencers at the 2008 Summer Olympics
Olympic fencers of France
Olympic gold medalists for France
Sportspeople from Bordeaux
Medalists at the 2008 Summer Olympics
Mediterranean Games bronze medalists for France
Competitors at the 2005 Mediterranean Games
Mediterranean Games medalists in fencing
Olympic medalists in fencing